The Totea gas field is a natural gas field located in Licurici, Gorj County. It was discovered in 2011 and developed by Petrom. It began production in 2011 and produces natural gas and condensates. The total proven reserves of the Totea gas field are around 360 billion cubic feet (10 km³), and production is centered on 16.9 million cubic feet/day (0.48×105m³).

References

Natural gas fields in Romania